The Treatise (original title Le Tretiz) is an Anglo-Norman poem written in the mid-13th century by Walter of Bibbesworth, addressed to Dionisie de Munchensi, with the aim of helping her to teach her children French, the language of the Norman aristocracy. It was a popular text in medieval England, and is a very early example of a book intended for reading to children.

How the author and the addressee knew one another is unknown, though their families both farmed land within reach of Hertford Fair, held annually from 1226. In some manuscripts the text opens with a preface stating that the work is written for Madame Dyonise de Mountechensi. In others the poem is preceded by a letter of dedication, addressed simply Chere suer ("Dear sister"), a phrase that expresses equality in their social relationship and some friendship between them. The letter continues: "You have asked me to put in writing for your children a phrase book to teach them French." 

Dionisie's name had been "de Anesty" until her marriage to Warin de Munchensi in 1234. From that date she had two young stepchildren, John and Joan de Munchensi (who were grandchildren of William Marshal) and she soon bore one child of her own, William. The book was perhaps written for Dionisie's marriage or soon after, and "John, William and Joan probably learned their French" from this book. Dionisie "lacked the requisite fluency" to make her children confident French-speakers but a knowledge of the language would be essential in the future careers of William, a turbulent politician, and especially Joan: she unexpectedly gained a "very rich inheritance" in 1247, and King Henry III chose her in the same year to marry his half-brother William of Valence.

The author's original intention was probably that the de Munchensi children would be looking at the text while Dionisie read it aloud. The poem, written in rhyming lines of irregular length (usually 7 or 8 syllables), presents a series of topics beginning with birth and childhood, listing plants, animals and animal cries, continuing through household tasks and farm work, including fishing, baking, brewing, house-building, ploughing and carting, and ending with a "great feast". An emphasis on learning to manage a household and an estate has been noted. The list of collective nouns for animals and the list of animal cries are the earliest sources for this special vocabulary in any European vernacular.

In all manuscripts many significant words in the French text are accompanied by English translations, written between the lines or in the margins. These glosses help to show that the book is intended for children whose first language is English and whose second language is to be French. A particular aim, according to the text, was that they should "be better taught in speech and not made fun of by others". The Treatise marks a turning point in the linguistic history of medieval England, showing that by its date English "had already become the mother tongue of the children of the Anglo-Norman nobility, and that they learnt it before they were taught French." It is among the very earliest books in any language explicitly intended "for children to hear and read". It remained a popular text for two centuries, as shown both by the number of manuscripts in which it survives independently, and by its re-use as part of the 14th-century collection Femina Nova, compiled for older students at a period when few English children learned French in their early years.

References

Further reading 
 Editions and translations
 Thomas Wright, ed., A Volume of Vocabularies (London, 1857) pp. 142–174 Text at archive.org (edition)
 Annie Owen, ed., Le Traité de Walter de Bibbesworth sur la langue française. Paris: PUF, 1929 (edition)
 Constance B. Hieatt, "Ore pur parler del array de une graunt mangerye": The Culture of the "Newe Get, c. 1285" in Mary J. Carruthers, Elizabeth D. Kirk, eds, Acts of Interpretation. The text in its contexts 700–1600. Essays on Medieval and Renaissance Literature in honor of E. Talbot Donaldson (Norman, Oklahoma: Pilgrim Books, 1982) pp. 219–233 (partial edition and translation)
 William Rothwell, ed., Walter de Bibbesworth: Le Tretiz. London: Anglo-Norman Text Society, 1990 (complete edition)
 Kathleen Kennedy, transl., "Le Tretiz of Walter of Bibbesworth" in Daniel T. Kline, ed., Medieval Literature for Children (London: Routledge, 2003) pp. 131–142 (partial translation)
 William Rothwell, Walter de Bibbesworth: Le Tretiz together with two Anglo-French poems in praise of women (2009: complete online edition)
 Andrew Dalby, ed. and transl., The Treatise of Walter of Bibbesworth. Totnes: Prospect Books, 2012.  (edition, based on Rothwell, and complete English translation) Preview

 Studies
 Albert C. Baugh, "The Date of Walter of Bibbesworth's Traité" in Horst Oppel, ed., Festschrift für Walther Fischer (Heidelberg: Winter, 1959) pp. 21–33
 Albert C. Baugh, T. Cable, A History of the English Language. 4th ed. London, 1993
 Alexander Bell, "Notes on Walter de Bibbesworth's Treatise" in Philological Quarterly vol. 41 (1962) pp. 361–372
 Renate Haas, "Femina: female roots of "foreign" language teaching and the rise of mother-tongue ideologies" in Exemplaria vol. 19 no. 1 (2007) pp. 139–162
 Karen K. Jambeck, "The Tretiz of Walter of Bibbesworth: cultivating the vernacular" in Albrecht Classen, ed., Childhood in the Middle Ages and the Renaissance (Berlin: Walter De Gruyter, 2005) pp. 159–184
 Kathleen Kennedy, "Changes in Society and Language Acquisition: the French language in England 1215–1480" in English Language Notes vol. 35 (1998) pp. 1–15
 Andres Kristol, "L'enseignement du français en Angleterre (XIIIe-XVe siècles): les sources manuscrites" in Romania vol. 111 (1990) pp. 289–330
 William Rothwell, "A Mis-Judged Author and a Mis-Used Text: Walter de Bibbesworth and His "Tretiz"" in Modern Language Review vol. 77 (1982) pp. 282–293
 William Rothwell, "Anglo-French and Middle English Vocabulary in Femina Nova" in Medium Aevum vol. 69 (2000) pp. 34–58
 William Rothwell, "Sugar and Spice and All Things Nice: From Oriental Bazar to English Cloister in Anglo-French" in Modern Language Review vol. 94 (1999) pp. 647–659
 William Rothwell, "The Teaching of French in Medieval England" in Modern Language Review vol. 63 (1968) pp. 37–46
 William Sayers, "Animal vocalization and human polyglossia in Walter of Bibbesworth's 13th-century domestic treatise in Anglo-Norman French" in Sign System Studies (Tartu, 2009) pp. 173–187

Anglo-Norman literature
Language education materials
British children's literature
13th-century poems
Treatises